Sarah Louise Kerrigan, the self-styled Queen of Blades, is a fictional character in Blizzard Entertainment's StarCraft franchise. The character was created by Chris Metzen and James Phinney, and her original appearance was designed by Metzen. Sarah Kerrigan is voiced by Glynnis Talken Campbell in StarCraft and Brood War, Tricia Helfer in StarCraft II: Wings of Liberty, Heart of the Swarm and Legacy of the Void, and Vanessa Marshall in Heroes of the Storm.

Kerrigan first appears in StarCraft as a twenty-six-year-old Terran Ghost, a psychic trained both physically and mentally as an expert espionage agent and assassin. Initially the second-in-command of Sons of Korhal, a revolutionary movement against the oppressive Confederacy of Man, she is captured by the insectoid Zerg and "infested" (in-universe term for genetic mutation), turning her into a human/Zerg hybrid completely under the control of the Zerg Overmind. She becomes one of the Zerg's most powerful agents, but during the Brood Wars, she replaces the Overmind following its destruction at the end of the great war, and gains control of the Zerg to seek dominance over the galaxy. Kerrigan's life before her infestation is further explored in the Starcraft novels Uprising and Liberty's Crusade, while Queen of Blades elaborates on her infested character.

As one of the major characters of the series, Kerrigan has been critically praised for her believability and character depth. Kerrigan is frequently featured in "top" character lists of video game female characters and villains.

Character design
The character of Kerrigan was created by Blizzard Entertainment's Chris Metzen and James Phinney, with her physical appearance designed by Metzen. Kerrigan was not originally intended to be a major character, and was only meant to appear on a single level. Initially based around the character Tanya Adams in the Command & Conquer: Red Alert series, Kerrigan was named after Nancy Kerrigan, who at the time was involved in a feud with Tonya Harding. However, Kerrigan's character grew on the developers, who decided to give a far greater role to the throw-away character. Kerrigan's self-proclaimed title is the "Queen of Blades", which is gradually introduced to other characters to the point where it is synonymous with her. Chris Metzen has explained that it was meant to be an honorific title; a blade is a weapon designed to rip enemies to pieces, making the title fitting for Kerrigan, who evolved to be the greatest agent of the Zerg Overmind.

In an interview Glynnis Talken Campbell, Kerrigan's voice actress from Starcraft and StarCraft: Brood War, described Kerrigan's change in personality during her infestation as "going from good girl to bad girl", and has said it was more of a change in personality than voice when providing her voice work. Kerrigan's voice also consisted of many grunts, growls and screams, and her unique infested voice was provided by doubling up Campbell's voice. She has also claimed that, were she to pen a StarCraft film or novel, she would rather have Kerrigan's relationship with Jim Raynor—the series' primary male protagonist—portrayed as one of admiration, sacrifice, and "them saving each other's butts" than actual romance due to StarCraft's action-oriented nature. While Campbell expressed interest in returning to voice the character in StarCraft II, and even voiced Kerrigan in the trailer for the game, she confirmed in February 2009 that she would not be reprising the role. Campbell stated that her work in the trailer was considered an audition of sorts and that Blizzard had decided to go in a different direction. Tricia Helfer replaced her, voicing Kerrigan in StarCraft II: Wings of Liberty as well as the expansions Heart of the Swarm and Legacy of the Void. The third voice of Kerrigan was Vanessa Marshall in the crossover video game Heroes of the Storm.

Personality
Having been conscripted into the Confederate Ghost program as a child due to her psychic potential, Kerrigan is described in the manual for StarCraft as never having been given the chance for a normal life. Her rigorous training and the use of neural implants to control her mental abilities leave her withdrawn and introverted. Despite this, Kerrigan exhibits qualities of courage and daring, and is an effective tactician. She is also described as a moral character, exemplified in her opposition to Arcturus Mengsk using the Zerg against the Confederacy. However, after her transformation by the Zerg, Kerrigan is freed from her inhibitions—as well as her neural conditioning—and indulges her darker traits (though Heart of the Swarm implies that at least part of her villainy was due to the influence of a fallen Xel'naga named Amon). Her attitude, combined with her natural intelligence, makes her extremely calculating and manipulative. A hint of her former moral sensitivity is to be noted when towards the end of the Zerg campaign of Brood War, she states how she feels weary of slaughter for the first time since her transformation. Kerrigan has also become far more physically aggressive, relishing close quarters combat so much that at one point in the novel Queen of Blades, she begins absent-mindedly licking the blood of her victims from her fingers.

One of the core elements of Kerrigan's personality is that of her manipulation by others, and her lack of identity. Her reversion to human form by Raynor allowed her to finally develop an identity for herself, though found her emotions torn between a man that she loved (Raynor) and a man that she despised (Mengsk).

Depiction
As a character with different incarnations, special powers, transformations, three unique personas, and ultimate amalgamation of four separate alien species, Kerrigan gains multiple aspects and aliases as the series progresses.

Ghost operative
Prior to her infestation, Kerrigan is described as being a graceful and deadly woman, exceedingly agile and athletic, possessing jade-green eyes and brilliant red hair usually worn as a ponytail. The novel Queen of Blades describes her facial features as being too strong to be classified as beautiful, but instead as striking and completely fitting for her personality. Kerrigan is rarely seen out of her armor, a form-fitting hostile environment suit specifically designed for Ghost operatives and equipped with a personal cloaking device, but when off-duty, she is described as wearing a soft work shirt, worn cotton pants with a dusty leather jacket, and high leather boots. Even then, it is uncommon for Kerrigan to be unarmed: she is always equipped with at least a combat knife.

Queen of Blades

Kerrigan's infestation by the Zerg signaled a major overhaul for her appearance. Despite maintaining her stature, build, and facial features, she is described in Queen of Blades as having mottled green skin, covered in a glossy protective carapace. Kerrigan's eyes are bright yellow as opposed to her natural green, and her hair has transformed into stalks, described as being segmented like an insect's legs. Kerrigan's fingers are stated to now contain extendible claws. A pair of skeletal wings has also grown from her back, consisting of elongated segmented spikes that reach down to the level of her knees. Kerrigan is seen using these wings as a melee weapon, tearing opponents apart.

Agent of Prophecy
Kerrigan ascended into Xel'naga form by consuming the essence of Ouros, the last remaining Xel'naga, marking a complete overhaul for her appearance. Her physique resembles that of her human form though her skin turns a metallic gold color with flames dancing along the surface.

In the Legacy of the Void epilogue cutscene a bokeh image of Kerrigan in her human form wearing her ghost armor is seen by Jim Raynor.

Appearances

In StarCraft
Sarah Kerrigan appears in StarCraft halfway through the first chapter of the game. She and Confederate officer Jim Raynor are tasked by Arcturus Mengsk, the leader of the militant rebel group Sons of Korhal, with starting a revolution on the fringe colony world of Antiga Prime by assassinating the presiding officers of the ruling Confederacy of Man. In response, the Confederacy blockades the planet as the insectoid Zerg Swarm begin to invade the surface, and Mengsk orders a skeptical Kerrigan to plant a psi emitter—stolen Confederate technology that attracts Zerg to it—to lure the Zerg into breaking the blockade, allowing the Sons of Korhal to escape. The Sons of Korhal then directly attack the Confederate capital world Tarsonis. During the attack, Mengsk, without consulting his officers, uses the psi emitters to ensure the complete destruction of the planet by the Zerg. The Zerg are subsequently attacked by the Protoss, a race of psionic aliens who attempt to stop further Zerg advancement and conquest. Kerrigan is sent with a detachment of troops to stop the Protoss from interfering with the Zerg rampage, but her position is overrun by the Zerg and she is abandoned by Mengsk. She is eventually captured for infestation after she runs out of ammo. As Raynor deserts Mengsk in disgust, Kerrigan is presumed dead.

However, Kerrigan does not perish, and as the second chapter begins, the player is charged by the Zerg hive mind, the Overmind, to protect a chrysalis it claims will be its greatest creation. The chrysalis eventually hatches on the Zerg world Char to reveal Kerrigan having been infested with Zerg DNA, making her a powerful hybrid of both Zerg and Terran genetics. Raynor, drawn to Char by psychic dreams cast by Kerrigan during her incubation, fails in an attempt to rescue her, but is spared as Kerrigan does not see him as a threat, and possibly due to any lingering affection she had for him. After breaking into a Terran science vessel and reversing the neural conditioning from her training as a psionic agent, Kerrigan is able to sense the presence of the Protoss fleet commander Tassadar on Char. Tassadar diverts Kerrigan's attention long enough for his companion Zeratul to assassinate Zasz, one of the Zerg commanders, with psionic energies the Zerg are unfamiliar with. This causes a temporary mental link between Zeratul and the Overmind, who uses this momentary contact with Zeratul's memories to locate the Protoss homeworld Aiur. The Overmind immediately launches the bulk of the Zerg Swarm in an invasion, although Kerrigan remains behind on Char to hunt down Tassadar and Zeratul.

In StarCraft: Brood War
Kerrigan's character is more central to StarCraft: Brood War (1998), as in the wake of the Overmind's death at the hands of Tassadar in the conclusion of StarCraft, Kerrigan regains her independence from the Zerg hive mind and dedicates her efforts to becoming the sole leader of the Zerg Swarm. She presents herself on the Protoss colony world Shakuras, where she informs Zeratul and the Protoss of a new Overmind growing on Char, manipulating them into destroying Zerg forces running rival to her goals. She also gains an ally in an apparently infested Samir Duran, who infiltrates the newly arrived forces of the United Earth Directorate (UED) and attempts to sabotage their mission to enslave the Zerg and seize control of the sector of the galaxy. However, the UED is successful in capturing the new Overmind, and Kerrigan exploits the threat of the UED to forge an alliance with Mengsk, Raynor and his new Protoss allies, turning around the war against the UED. However, Kerrigan quickly betrays this alliance and strikes at the armies of Raynor and Mengsk, heavily damaging both groups. Accompanied by Duran, Kerrigan returns to Shakuras to abduct the Protoss leader Raszagal, using her to blackmail Zeratul into killing the new Overmind on Char, after which all Zerg fall under Kerrigan's control—around this time, she begins her self-proclamation as the Queen of Blades. Zeratul attempts to rescue Raszagal, but kills her when he realizes her mind has been destroyed by Kerrigan's brainwashing. Kerrigan, surprised by his actions, allows him to live. Soon after, Kerrigan's position on Char is attacked by a vengeful Protoss fleet, the remnants of the UED's invasion force and a mercenary fleet commanded by Mengsk. Despite being outnumbered, Kerrigan's forces prevail, crippling her enemies and eradicating the UED fleet, thereby securing a dominant position in the sector.

In StarCraft II: Wings of Liberty
Kerrigan returns in StarCraft II: Wings of Liberty (2010). At BlizzCon 2007, Chris Metzen explained that in the years after Brood War, Kerrigan relocated to Char, pulling back most of the Zerg, and has since been quiet. She has the power to wipe out all her enemies but has not, creating a tense state of peace in the sector. Metzen also indicated an interest in exploring if there was any humanity left in Kerrigan or if she is beyond redemption in her current state. He revealed that Kerrigan's withdrawal has little to do with any suspicion she has of Duran, who is revealed towards the end of Brood War to be conducting secret experiments on creating a Protoss/Zerg hybrid; she does not know much about him, but in the time after Brood War, she is beginning to piece together the puzzle surrounding his motives. At BlizzCon 2008, Kerrigan made two brief appearances in cinematic trailers, one during an attack on a Terran city that was captured on video, and again in a series of caverns where Zeratul was studying ancient runes; in the latter, Kerrigan implies she has been waiting for his arrival.

In StarCraft II, Kerrigan launches an attack on the Terran Dominion colonies. At first, her motives seem to be revenge - however, later it is discovered that she is pursuing various pieces of a Xel'naga artifact of great power. Coincidentally, these are the same artifacts that Jim Raynor is pursuing at the request of his recently freed friend Tychus Findlay and his benefactor, the Moebius Foundation. Raynor's forces and Kerrigan constantly bump heads throughout this pursuit, with Kerrigan displaying her now trademark character traits of arrogance and a hunger for power. Raynor soon learns from Valerian Mengsk, son of Arcturus Mengsk and the real face behind the Moebius Foundation, that the Xel'naga artifacts he has been pursuing, when pieced together, have the power to return Kerrigan to her human form.  At one point, Zeratul suddenly appears on board Raynor's ship and hands to him a crystal containing memories from his recent ventures. The memories on the crystal chronicle prompt Raynor to discover the truth behind an ancient Xel'naga prophecy, a quest which leads him to run into Kerrigan several times in the process. Through these memories Raynor learns just how important it is to ensure that Kerrigan does not perish, for she is the chosen one to win the coming battle against the Protoss-Zerg hybrids. Through Zeratul's crystal, Raynor is also granted the vision of a possible future, one without Kerrigan, where the Protoss are rendered extinct shortly after the Terrans are annihilated. After seeing this vision, Raynor mounts an invasion on Char in collaboration with Dominion forces to eliminate the Zerg forces on the planet. The Xel'naga artifact releases an energy blast that wipes the Zerg infection clean off the planet. When Raynor and Findlay seek Kerrigan in the ruins, she is found to have mostly returned to her human form, with only her hair remaining Zerg-like. However, Raynor is forced to kill Findlay when he attempts to assassinate Kerrigan, under orders from his "benefactor", who is revealed to be Arcturus Mengsk. Raynor then carries the weakened Kerrigan over the ruined battlefield to safety.

In StarCraft II: Heart of the Swarm
Her next appearance was in StarCraft II: Heart of the Swarm, where she is the central character, and it tells the story of her further fate, and of the Zerg Swarm as well. Once again a human, Kerrigan is brought by Raynor to a secret research facility run by Valerian Mengsk to determine how much of her skill at controlling Zerg remains from her time as the Queen of Blades. However, the facility is attacked by Dominion forces and while Kerrigan and Valerian manage to escape, Raynor becomes trapped. After returning to look for him, Kerrigan hears Mengsk's announcement that he was captured and executed. To enact revenge against Mengsk, Kerrigan, while traveling through the sector to reunite the Zerg Swarm under her control, is approached by Zeratul. Zeratul tells her to travel to Zerus, the original homeworld of the Zerg, where the primal Zerg are in a constantly evolving state. Kerrigan, initially reluctant, is convinced after Zeratul tells her there she can obtain enough power to move on with her vengeance plans. On Zerus, Kerrigan learns that Amon stole a large portion of the Zerg from Zerus and bound them to a single overriding will, making them Amon's slaves as part of his plot to destroy both the Zerg and Protoss and remake life in his own image. Kerrigan enters a chrysalis in the first Zerg spawning pool and emerges, transforming again into the primal Queen of Blades. She also realizes that Amon's lingering taint was partially responsible for the crimes she committed during the Brood War. Mengsk contacts Kerrigan and reveals that Raynor was not killed, but is held as a hostage instead, threatening to kill him should she wage war against the Dominion. With help from Valerian and Raynor's Raiders, Kerrigan manages to rescue Raynor, but is rejected by him for renouncing the human self that he worked so hard to restore. Now in full control of the Zerg Swarm once again, Kerrigan launches an attack on the Dominion's main world, Korhal, to defeat Mengsk. Valerian convinces her to permit civilian evacuation. As a result, Raynor and his raiders reinforce her assault on the imperial palace. Confronting Mengsk face to face, Kerrigan is almost killed by the Xel'naga artifact before Raynor disables it. Kerrigan kills Mengsk, and bids Raynor farewell to prepare the swarm for "the greatest battle they'll ever face".

In StarCraft II: Legacy of the Void
During the events of Legacy of the Void, Kerrigan enters into an alliance with Artanis while investigating the Xel'Naga "homeworld" Ulnar, which the pair discover is in fact a colossal space station. Some time after Artanis's reclamation of the Protoss homeworld, Aiur, Kerrigan sends a psionic call to Raynor and Artanis: she proposes an alliance to permanently defeat Amon, since he will only arise again in a few thousand years if he is not dealt with. During the assault of the Void by the joint forces of the Terran Dominion, Zerg Swarm and Protoss Dae'laam, the full context of Zeratul's prophecy about Kerrigan is made clear; only a fellow Xel'Naga is capable of killing Amon, and Kerrigan is the only one who can ascend to that status. With the remainder of the joint armada, Kerrigan is successful in killing Amon during her psychic backlash in the void.

The game's final cutscene is set two years later. Raynor is alone in a bar on planet Mar Sara. Without further explanation, Kerrigan appears in the background, out of focus, in her human form and ghost armour. She asks Jim if he is ready to leave, to which he replies jovially, "Hell, it's about time." Jim is seen approaching her as the screen fades to white. Text appears on the screen saying that Raynor is never heard from again, though Kerrigan is not mentioned.

In Heroes of the Storm
Kerrigan appears as a playable character in Blizzard's non-canon crossover video game Heroes of the Storm.

In novels
Kerrigan appears in several StarCraft novels that greatly expand her backstory before the first StarCraft game. The novel Uprising portrays Kerrigan's training as a Ghost assassin from an early age, where she is subjected to intense psychological abuse from her Confederate trainer, Lieutenant Rumm. When she was a young girl, an accident, most likely involving her powers, kills her mother and puts her father in a vegetative state. Consequently, Kerrigan is terrified to use her psionic abilities, and refuses Rumm's demands to show her power, even when he threatens to kill her father. Kerrigan is eventually subdued with mental implants and used as a top Confederate assassin until she is rescued by Arcturus Mengsk. The novels Liberty's Crusade and Queen of Blades provide novelisations for Kerrigan's actions in Episodes I and II of StarCraft respectively. Liberty's Crusade develops the implied relationship between Jim Raynor and Kerrigan, while Queen of Blades serves to demonstrate Kerrigan's complete transformation by the Zerg, her removal of her inhibitions and morality, and its effect on her former love, Raynor.

In addition, Kerrigan briefly appears in Gabriel Mesta's Shadow of the Xel'naga, set between StarCraft and Brood War, in which she attempts to secure a Xel'naga artifact on the independent colony world Bhekar Ro, but fails when it eradicates her forces. Kerrigan is also observed in Shadow Hunters, the second novel in The Dark Templar Saga, a trilogy that acts as a precursor to StarCraft II. After sensing a nexus of joined human minds caused by protagonist Jake Ramsey at the end of the first novel, Kerrigan sends Zerg forces to its location, infesting the half-dead body of a Dominion-funded black marketeer, Ethan Stewart. As the attack is the first Zerg activity for years, it inadvertently raises the suspicions of Arcturus Mengsk, who wonders what could have motivated it.

Reception

Kerrigan has been received positively by critics. IGN's review of StarCraft drew note to the evolution of Kerrigan's character through the story, labelling it as unforgettable and describing her transformation as "chilling". Kerrigan was included among the 50 greatest female characters in the history of video games by Tom's Games in 2007, which described her personality as amounting to one of the "most fascinatingly complex and memorable characters of all time." In 2012, she was ranked as 23rd "hottest" fictional woman of the year by UGO Entertainment. At the 2010 Spike Video Game Awards, Tricia Helfer won "Best Performance by a Human Female" for her voicing of Kerrigan in StarCraft II: Wings of Liberty.

Numerous video-game journalists have ranked Kerrigan among the best villains in gaming. A 2010 GameSpot poll ranked her as the greatest video game villain of all time, and in 2012, Complex's Hanuman Welch considered her the most evil woman in video gaming. In 2013, Game Informer's Liz Lanier included Kerrigan among top ten female villains in video games, stating that "Kerrigan is as brutal as she is misunderstood. While once a skilled psychic terran, her captures by Zerg leads to her transformation into the Queen of Blades. With the rare ability to be both merciless and sympathetic, the leader of the swarm is an unforgettable villain." GamesRadar staff have consistently include Kerrigan in their evolving list of the best video game villains.

Kerrigan is featured in numerous StarCraft merchandise, including toys and miniature statues. Due to the complexity of Kerrigan's infested appearance, she is cited as a particularly difficult character for cosplaying, though attempts have been praised. Dwight Schrute dresses as Kerrigan for a halloween party on a season 8 episode of The Office. The character is the subject of the song "Queen of Blades" by Swedish band Avatar on their third album "Avatar". On February 16, 2012, Dutch electronic music producer Maduk released Ghost Assassin, a Liquicity collaboration with Canadian singer and songwriter Veela that is meant to serve as an anthem for Kerrigan's arc throughout the StarCraft franchise.

Further reading

References

Bibliography

External links
Sarah Kerrigan at battle.net

Extraterrestrial–human hybrids in video games
Female characters in video games
Female video game villains
Fictional assassins in video games
Fictional child soldiers
Fictional female lieutenants
Fictional genocide perpetrators
Queen characters in video games
StarCraft characters
Telepath characters in video games
Video game antagonists
Video game characters introduced in 1998
Video game characters with superhuman strength
Video game mascots
Video game protagonists
Woman soldier and warrior characters in video games